Patrick Lowrey (born 11 October 1950) was an English professional footballer who played as a forward for Sunderland. winning the FA youth cup with them in 1969 and scoring a hat trick in the second leg of the Final verses West Bromwich Albion in the process.  Paddy signed apprentice professional forms for Newcastle United aged 15 on 27 May 1966 just hours after having left Rutherford Grammar school. United scouts Temple Lisle and Tommy Jordan had to fight off West Bromwich Albion, Chelsea, Sheffield United, Sunderland, Leeds United, Coventry, Birmingham  Preston and Blackburn to land Lowrey

Lowrey played in the Australian National Soccer League in the 1977 season for Mooroolbark and Western Suburbs.

References

1950 births
Living people
Footballers from Newcastle upon Tyne
English footballers
Association football forwards
Newcastle United F.C. players
Sunderland A.F.C. players
Darlington F.C. players
Workington A.F.C. players
English Football League players
Mooroolbark SC players